Marianne Agulhon (born 19 March 1966 in Oujda, Morocco) is a French slalom canoeist who competed from the late 1980s to the mid-1990s. She won two medals at the ICF Canoe Slalom World Championships with a gold (K1 team: 1991) and a bronze (K1: 1993).

Agulhon also finished fifth in the K1 event at the 1992 Summer Olympics in Barcelona.

World Cup individual podiums

References

External links 
 Marianne AGULHON at CanoeSlalom.net

1966 births
People from Oujda
Canoeists at the 1992 Summer Olympics
French female canoeists
Living people
Olympic canoeists of France
Medalists at the ICF Canoe Slalom World Championships